Celso Reyes Daza (born July 28, 1961) is a luchador, or professional wrestler, best known under his ring name Ciclón Ramírez (Spanish for "Cyclone Ramirez). Reyes worked as Pegaso I for six years before switching to the Ciclón Ramirez name in 1988. As Ramirez he originally worked as an enmascarado, or masked wrestler but was unmasked after losing a Luchas de Apuestas, or bet fight, to El Felino. The character "Ciclón Ramirez" is billed as a relative of the character Huracán Ramírez, which is a storyline invented for wrestling. Reyes' son currently works as Ciclón Ramírez Jr.

Professional wrestling career
Celso Reyes Daza began his professional wrestling career in 1982, initially working under the ring name Ovni, but soon changed his name to Pegasso I (Spanish for Pegasus I), an enmascarado (masked wrestler) character based on the mythical Pegasus. Initially he teamed with Pegasso II, but the Pegasso team did not last long as Reyes struck out on his own as a singles wrestler. On March 17, 1985 Pegaso I defeated El Modulo to win the Mexican National Lightweight Championship, his first professional wrestling championship. Pegaso I held the title for 118 days before losing it to El Khalifa. Reyes continued to work as Pegaso I until 1988 where he assumed a new enmascarado identity, Ciclón Ramírez, a fictional brother of Huracán Ramírez, a legendary Luchador. Ciclón Ramírez defeated Bestia Salvaje in the final of a tournament to win the Mexican National Welterweight Championship on May 21, 1980. Ramírez held the title for 430 days, defending the title on several occasions before losing it to Canelo Casas on July 25, 1990 a full 430 days after winning it. Ramírez regained the Welterweight title from Canelo Casas on February 13, 1991. In the early 1990s Ciclón Ramírez began teaming with Águila Solitaria and Pantera to form a group known as Las Saetas del Ring (Spanish for "The Arrows of the Ring") Together Las Saetas won the Nuevo León State Trios Championship and the Veracruz State Trios Championship, before winning the Distrito Federal Trios Championship from Los Tarascos in 1991. La Saetas later lost the Distrito Federal Trios title to Los Metalicos (Oro, Plata and Bronce). Ciclón Ramírez second run with the Mexican National Welterweight Title lasted for 508 days, ending on July 5, 1992 when he lost the title to El Felino. In August, 1992 Ramírez won a tournament for the vacant Mexican National Welterweight title after El Felino had vacated it. In the final Ciclón Ramírez defeated Fantasma de la Quebrada to win the Welterweight title for the third time. This third, and so far final run with the Welterweight title lasted only 45 days before he lost it to Fantasma de la Quebrada. After losing the Mexican National title Ciclón Ramírez began a storyline feud with El Felino, initially over the CMLL World Welterweight Championship that El Felino held and Ciclón Ramírez won, but moved beyond that as the two met in a Luchas de Apuestas (bet fight) where El Felino pinned Ciclón Ramírez to unmask him. The feud culminated when El Felino finally regained the title on March 30, 1994. Following the culmination of the storyline with El Felino Ramírez left Consejo Mundial de Lucha Libre (CMLL) and began working on the Mexican independent circuit. He began teaming with two "storyline" cousins Nuevo Huracán Ramírez Jr. (New Huracán Ramírez Jr.) and El Hijo del Huracán Ramírez (the son of Huracán Ramírez) to win the Distrito Federal Trios title once more. The trio held the title until October 1995 where they lost to Los Destructores (Rocco Valente, Tony Arce and Vulcano). After the loss Reyes briefly worked as "Mr. Ramírez" and later on as Tiburón in Promo Azteca between 1996 and 1997. By the late 1990s Reyes returned to using the Ciclón Ramírez name, working for International Wrestling Revolution Group (IWRG) where he defeated Dr. Cerebro on June 29, 2000 to win the IWRG Intercontinental Welterweight Championship. Ramírez held the title for 45 days before Dr. Cerebro regained the title. In recent years Reyes has helped train and promote his son who wrestles as "Ciclón Ramírez Jr." while still working on the Mexican independent circuit.

Championships and accomplishments
Consejo Mundial de Lucha Libre
CMLL World Welterweight Championship (1 time)
Mexican National Lightweight Championship (1 time) – as Pegaso I
Mexican National Welterweight Championship (3 times)
Comision de Box y Lucha Distrito Federal
Distrito Federal Welterweight Championship (1 time)
Distrito Federal Trios Championship (2 times) – with Hijo de Huracán Ramírez and Huracán Ramírez Jr., with Águila Solitaria and El Pantera
International Wrestling Revolution Group
IWRG Intercontinental Welterweight Championship (1 time)
Mexican Regional Championships
Arena Santa Maria Aztahuacán Tag Team Championship (1 time) – with SWAT
Naucalpan Middleweight Championship
Nuevo León Trios Championship (1 time) – with Águila Solitaria and El Pantera
Occident Welterweight Championship (1 time) – as Pegaso I
Veracruz Trios Championship (1 time) – with Águila Solitaria and El Pantera
Lucha Libre Total
LLT Championship (1 Time)

Luchas de Apuestas record

Notes

References

1961 births
Living people
Mexican male professional wrestlers
People from Acapulco
Professional wrestlers from Guerrero
CMLL World Welterweight Champions
Mexican National Welterweight Champions